A geophone is a device that converts ground movement (velocity) into voltage, which may be recorded at a recording station. The deviation of this measured voltage from the base line is called the seismic response and is analyzed for structure of the earth.

Etymology
The term geophone derives from the Greek word "γῆ (ge)
" meaning "earth" and "phone" meaning "sound".

Construction

Geophones have historically been passive analog devices and typically comprise a spring-mounted wire coil moving within the field of a case-mounted permanent magnet to generate an electrical signal. Recent designs have been based on microelectromechanical systems (MEMS) technology which generates an electrical response to ground motion through an active feedback circuit to maintain the position of a small piece of silicon.

The response of a coil/magnet geophone is proportional to ground velocity, while MEMS devices usually respond proportional to
acceleration. MEMS have a much higher noise level (50 dB velocity higher) than geophones and can only be used in strong motion or active seismic applications.

Frequency response
The frequency response of a geophone is that of a harmonic oscillator, fully determined by corner frequency (typically around 10 Hz) and damping (typically 0.707). Since the corner frequency is proportional to the inverse square root of the moving mass, geophones with low corner frequencies (< 1 Hz) become impractical. It is possible to lower the corner frequency
electronically, at the price of higher noise and cost.

Although waves passing through the earth have a three-dimensional nature, geophones are normally constrained to respond to single dimension - usually the vertical. However, some applications require the full wave to be used and three-component or 3-C geophones are used.  In analog devices, three moving coil elements are mounted in an orthogonal arrangement within a single case.

Uses

The majority of geophones are used in reflection seismology to record the energy waves reflected by the subsurface geology. In this case the primary interest is in the vertical motion of the Earth's surface. However, not all the waves are upwards travelling.  A strong, horizontally transmitted wave known as ground-roll also generates vertical motion that can obliterate the weaker vertical signals.  By using large areal arrays tuned to the wavelength of the ground-roll the dominant noise signals can be attenuated and the weaker data signals reinforced.

Analog geophones are very sensitive devices which can respond to very distant tremors. These small signals can be drowned by larger signals from local sources. It is possible though to recover the small signals caused by large but distant events by correlating signals from several geophones deployed in an array. Signals which are registered only at one or few geophones can be attributed to unwanted, local events and thus discarded. It can be assumed that small signals that register uniformly at all geophones in an array can be attributed to a distant and therefore significant event.

The sensitivity of passive geophones is typically 30 volts per (meter per second), so they are in general not a replacement for 
broadband seismometers.

Conversely, some applications of geophones are interested only in very local events. A notable example is in the application of remote ground sensors (RGS) incorporated in unattended ground sensor (UGS) systems. In such an application there is an area of interest which when penetrated a system operator is to be informed, perhaps by an alert which could be accompanied by supporting photographic data.

A network of geophones has been used on the lunar surface.

See also 
 Accelerometer
 Hydrophone
 Michelson interferometer
 Seismometer

References

External links

 PSR-1 Seismic Intrusion Detector (Vietnam era military device)

Seismology instruments